John McQuillan (30 August 1920 – 8 March 1998) was an Irish politician, trade union official and army officer.

Early life
He was born in Ballyforan, County Roscommon in 1920, the eldest of seven childlen. His father, Thomas Francis McQuillan was a Royal Irish Constabulary sergeant, and later became a school teacher, while his mother Anne (née Fallon) was a national school teacher who came from a Republican family. 
McQuillan was educated at Roscommon CBS, Summerhill College, Sligo, and St Clement's Redemptorist College, Limerick.

He was a member of the Roscommon county team that won the All-Ireland Senior Football Championship in 1943 and 1944. He began a career as an officer in the Irish Army though resigned to work as a local government official.

Politics
He was elected to Dáil Éireann on his first attempt as a Clann na Poblachta Teachta Dála (TD) for the Roscommon constituency at the 1948 general election. After fellow Clann na Poblachta TD, Noël Browne resigned as Minister for Health, McQuillan resigned from Clann na Poblachta in support of Browne and sat as an independent TD. He was re-elected at the 1951, 1954 and 1957 general elections as an independent TD.

On 16 May 1958, the National Progressive Democrats party was founded with Noël Browne and McQuillan as the party's leaders. Between 1958 and 1961, 7 of the 9 motions discussed in Private Member's Time had been proposed by one of them. In 1961 and 1962 they asked 1,400 parliamentary questions, 17% of the total. The Taoiseach Seán Lemass paid them a unique compliment by referring to them as "the real opposition". Both were re-elected at the 1961 general election. In October 1963 both men joined the Labour Party. This new arrangement did not prove electorally beneficial to McQuillan as he lost his seat in Roscommon at the 1965 general election. However, he was elected to Seanad Éireann by the Administrative Panel. He resigned the Labour Party whip in 1967 and did not seek re-election at the 1969 general election, and retired from his Roscommon County Council seat in 1974.

When the Socialist Labour Party was founded in 1977, McQuillan joined as a trustee of the new party but later resigned. Remaining close to Noël Browne he lobbied hard for him to get the Labour Party nomination to contest the 1990 presidential election for the Labour Party. However, Mary Robinson was the preferred candidate of Dick Spring.

He died on 8 March 1998 in Bray, County Wicklow.

References

Sources
Kevin Rafter (1996), The Clann: The Story of Clann na Poblachta
John Horgan (2000), Noel Browne: Passionate Outsider
Noel Browne (1986), Against the Tide (Gill & Macmillan)

External links
 A radio documentary, 3×45min CDs first broadcast on RosFM.

1920 births
1998 deaths
Ballyforan Gaelic footballers
Clann na Poblachta TDs
Independent TDs
Irish Army officers
Irish sportsperson-politicians
Irish socialists
Irish trade unionists
Labour Party (Ireland) TDs
Members of the 11th Seanad
Members of the 13th Dáil
Members of the 14th Dáil
Members of the 15th Dáil
Members of the 16th Dáil
Members of the 17th Dáil
National Progressive Democrats TDs
Politicians from County Roscommon
Roscommon inter-county Gaelic footballers
St Dominic's Gaelic footballers
Labour Party (Ireland) senators
Independent members of Seanad Éireann